The following lists events that happened during 1999 in South Africa.

Incumbents
 President:
 Nelson Mandela (until 16 June).
 Thabo Mbeki (from 16 June).
 Deputy President: Thabo Mbeki (until 16 June), Jacob Zuma (starting 16 June).
 Chief Justice: Ismail Mahomed.

Cabinet 
The Cabinet, together with the President and the Deputy President, forms part of the Executive.

National Assembly

Provincial Premiers 
 Eastern Cape Province: Makhenkesi Stofile 
 Free State Province: Ivy Matsepe-Casaburri (until 15 June), Winkie Direko (since 15 June)
 Gauteng Province: Mathole Motshekga (until 15 June), Mbhazima Shilowa (since 15 June)
 KwaZulu-Natal Province: Ben Ngubane (until 10 February), Lionel Mtshali (since 10 February)
 Limpopo Province: Ngoako Ramathlodi
 Mpumalanga Province: Mathews Phosa (until 15 June), Ndaweni Mahlangu (since 15 June)
 North West Province: Popo Molefe 
 Northern Cape Province: Manne Dipico
 Western Cape Province: Gerald Morkel

Events
January
 14 – South African Police Service Captain Bennie Lategan who was investigating People Against Gangsterism and Drugs (PAGAD) is killed in a drive-by-shooting in Cape Town.
 27 – Controversial youth drama series, Yizo Yizo debuts on SABC 1.

March
 4 – BBC Prime was launched for the very first time in South Africa.
 20 – The Azanian People's Liberation Army (APLA), the military wing of the Pan Africanist Congress (PAC), disbands.
 24 – Allan Boesak, former Director of the Foundation for Peace and Justice, is sentenced to 8 years in prison for fraud.
 31 – The Durban High Court finds Sipho Thwala guilty of 16 murders and 10 rapes and sentences him to 506 years in prison.

April
 20 – Judge Edwin Cameron, high court judge and human rights advocate, announces that he is HIV positive.
 23 – Makhaya Ntini, cricketer, is found guilty of raping a student.

May
 29 – Cathy O'Dowd becomes the first woman to summit Mount Everest from both the north and south sides.

June
 2 – The second democratic elections take place and is won by the African National Congress.
 10 – George Bizos is awarded the Order for Meritorious Service, Class II, by President Nelson Mandela.
 16 – Thabo Mbeki becomes the second President of South Africa.
 Watershed are signed to EMI Music South Africa and begin recording their first album In the Meantime.

August
 British children's television series Thomas The Tank Engine & Friends returns to airing on television in South Africa after a very long absence since its very last air on TV1 (now SABC 2). The series will now broadcast on  M-Net as part of their K-T.V. children's block.

September
 2 – A South African Air Force Alouette III helicopter crashes near Port Elizabeth, killing pilot Major K.A. Newman and seriously injuring two crew members.
 10–19 – The All-Africa Games take place in Johannesburg.

October
 22 – Henry Navigator, a 13,000 ton Cyprus bulk carrier, sinks off Bok Point about 35 km north of Cape Town.
 23 – A South African Air Force Oryx helicopter crashes near Kroonstad, killing 10 people and injuring 14 others.
 Queen Elizabeth II and The Duke of Edinburgh visit South Africa.
 The Greater St. Lucia Wetland Park is declared a UNESCO World Heritage Site.

November
 11 – UK children's stop motion animated series Bob the Builder begins on SABC 2 and was shown every Thursday.
 15 – Afrikaans language television channel kykNET is launched.

December
 3 – Government signs the final purchasing agreement in the arms deal and the loan agreement to pay for the equipment is signed by Finance Minister Trevor Manuel.

Unknown Date
 Statistics South Africa conducts a Survey of Activities of Young People.

Births
 16 February – Chloe Meecham, water polo player
 2 April – Elaine, singer and songwriter
 Masego Kgomo, muti murder victim. (d. 2009)

Deaths
 10 January – Gavin Relly, businessman and Chairman of Anglo American. (b. 1926)
 26 May – David Millin, 78, movie director, producer, and cinematographer (b. 1920)
 27 July – Simon "Mahlathini" Nkabinde, mbaqanga singer (b.1938)
 15 November – Pieter van der Byl, politician (b. 1923)

References

South Africa
Years in South Africa
History of South Africa